Poi is a traditional staple food in the Polynesian diet, made from taro.

Traditional poi is produced by mashing cooked starch on a wooden pounding board, with a carved pestle made from basalt, calcite, coral or wood. Modern methods use an industrial food processor to produce large quantities for retail distribution. Water is added to the starch during mashing, and again just before eating, to achieve the desired consistency, which can range from highly viscous to liquid. In Hawaii, this is classified as either "one-finger",  "two-finger", or "three-finger", alluding to how many fingers are required to scoop it up (the thicker the poi, the fewer fingers required to scoop a sufficient mouthful).

Poi can be eaten immediately, when fresh and sweet, or left to ferment and become sour, developing a smell reminiscent of plain yoghurt. A layer of water on top can prevent fermenting poi from developing a crust.

History and culture

Poi is thought to have originated in the Marquesas Islands, created some time after initial settlement from Polynesian explorers. While mashing food does occur in other parts of the Pacific, the method involved was more rudimentary. In Western Polynesia, the cooked starch was mashed in a wooden bowl using a makeshift pounder out of either the stem of a coconut leaf or a hard unripe breadfruit with several wooden pegs stuck into it. The origins of poi coincided with the development of basalt pounders in the Marquesas, which soon spread elsewhere in Eastern Polynesia, with the exception of New Zealand and Easter Island.

Poi was considered such an important and sacred aspect of daily Hawaiian life that Hawaiians believed that the spirit of Hāloa, the legendary ancestor of the Hawaiian people, was present when a bowl of poi was uncovered for consumption at the family dinner table. Accordingly, all conflict among family members was required to come to an immediate halt.

Hawaiians traditionally cook the starchy, potato-like heart of the taro corm for hours in an underground oven called an imu, which is also used to cook other types of food such as pork, carrots, and sweet potatoes.

Fermentation

Poi has a paste-like texture and a delicate flavor when freshly prepared in the traditional manner, with a pale purple color that naturally comes from the taro corm.  It has a smooth, creamy texture.  The flavor changes distinctly once the poi has been made: fresh poi is sweet and edible; each day thereafter the poi loses sweetness and turns sour due to a natural fermentation that involves Lactobacillus bacteria, yeast, and Geotrichum fungi.  Therefore, some people find fermented poi more palatable if it is mixed with milk or sugar or both. The speed of this fermentation process depends upon the bacteria level present in the poi, but the souring process can be slowed by storing poi in a cool, dark location. To prepare commercial poi that has been stored in a refrigerator, it is squeezed out of the bag into a bowl (sometimes adding water), and a thin layer of water is put over the part exposed to air to keep a crust from forming on top. New commercial preparations of poi require refrigeration, but stay fresh longer and taste sweeter.

Sour poi is still edible but may be less palatable, and is usually served with salted fish or Hawaiian lomi salmon on the side (as in the lyrics "my fish and poi"). Sourness can be prevented by freezing or dehydrating fresh poi, although the resulting poi after defrosting or rehydrating tends to taste bland when compared to the fresh product. Sour poi has an additional use as a cooking ingredient with a sour flavor (similar to buttermilk), usually in breads and rolls.

Nutrition and dietary and medical uses
Taro is low in fat, high in vitamin A, and abounds in complex carbohydrates.

Poi has been used specifically as a milk substitute for babies, or as a baby food.  It is supposed to be easy to digest.  It contains no gluten, making it safe to eat for people who have celiac disease or a gluten intolerance.

See also

 List of ancient dishes and foods
 Fufu – West African dish made from mashed cassava
 Nilupak – Filipino delicacies made from mashed starchy foods
 Ube halaya – Philippine dessert made from purple yam

Citations

General and cited  references 
 Sky Barnhart, "Powered by Poi Kalo, a Legendary Plant, Has Deep Roots in Hawaiian Culture", NO KA 'OI Maui Magazine, July/August 2007. Retrieved on 13 November 2012.
 Amy C. Brown and Ana Valiere, "The Medicinal Uses of Poi", The National Center for Biotechnology Information, 23 June 2006. Retrieved on 13 November 2012.
 Pamela Noeau Day, "Poi – The Ancient 'New' Superfood", POI, 22 December 2009. Retrieved on 11 November 2012.
 Stacy Yuen Hernandez, Got Poi? The Original Hawaiian Diet, POI, 24 March 2009. Retrieved on 11 November 2012.
 Marcia Z. Mager, What Is Poi Anyway?, POI, 24 March 2009. Retrieved on 11 November 2012.
 Craig W. Walsh, Where Can I Buy Poi?, POI, 26 May 2005. Retrieved on 12 November 2012.

External links

 The History of Poi
 "Powered By Poi". Maui No Ka 'Oi Magazine, Vol. 11, No. 4 (July 2007).
 "Kipahulu Kitchen". Maui No Ka 'Oi Magazine, Vol. 10 No. 2 (April 2006). Article about community commercial kitchen in Kipahulu, Maui, where poi is made.
 "Poi". YouTube video about the making of Poi.

Ancient dishes
Cook Islands cuisine
French Polynesian cuisine
Fermented foods
Hawaiian cuisine
National dishes
Oceanian cuisine
Polynesian cuisine
Porridges
Staple foods
Taro dishes